Michael Butler (born 4 February 2000) is an Irish hurler who plays for Kilkenny Senior Championship club O'Loughlin Gaels and at inter-county level with the Kilkenny senior hurling team. He usually lines out as a right corner-back.

Career

Butler played hurling at juvenile and underage levels with the O'Loughlin Gaels club, while simultaneously lining out as a schoolboy with CBS Kilkenny. After securing minor and under-21 titles, he eventually progressed on the club's senior team and lined out in the 2021 Kilkenny SHC final defeat by Ballyhale Shamrocks. Butler first appeared on the inter-county scene as a member of the Kilkenny minor hurling team that won the Leinster MHC title in 2017, before subsequently winning a Leinster U20 title in 2019. He made his Kilkenny senior hurling team debut during the 2022 National Hurling League.

Career statistics

Honours

O'Loughlin Gaels
Kilkenny Under-21 Hurling Championship: 2019
Kilkenny Minor Hurling Championship: 2017

Kilkenny
Leinster Senior Hurling Championship: 2022
Leinster Under-20 Hurling Championship: 2019
Leinster Minor Hurling Championship: 2017

Awards
All-Star Award (1): 2022
GAA-GPA Young Hurler of the Year (1): 2022

References

2000 births
Living people
O'Loughlin Gaels hurlers
Kilkenny inter-county hurlers